Minuscule 290 (in the Gregory-Aland numbering), ε 512 (Soden), is a Greek minuscule paper manuscript of the New Testament. Paleographic analysis it has assigned it to the 14th century. 
It has marginalia.

Description 

The codex contains a complete text of the four Gospels on 259 paper leaves. The text is written in one column per page, in 22 lines per page.

Text 

The Greek text of the codex is a representative of the Byzantine text-type. Hermann von Soden classified it to the textual family Kr. Aland placed it in Category V.
According to the Claremont Profile Method it belongs to the textual family Kr in Luke 1 and Luke 20, and creates textual pair with 363.

History 

Formerly the manuscript was held at Sorbonne. It was added to the list of New Testament manuscripts by Scholz (1794-1852). 
It was examined by Scholz. It was examined and described by Paulin Martin. C. R. Gregory saw the manuscript in 1885.

The manuscript is currently housed at the Bibliothèque nationale de France (Suppl. Gr. 108) at Paris.

See also 

 List of New Testament minuscules
 Biblical manuscript
 Textual criticism

References

Further reading 

 Jean-Pierre-Paul Martin, Description technique des manuscrits grecs, relatif au Nouveau Testament, conservé dans les bibliothèques des Paris (Paris 1883), p. 71

Greek New Testament minuscules
14th-century biblical manuscripts
Bibliothèque nationale de France collections